IHRA Drag Racing is a series of racing video games about drag racing published by Bethesda Softworks, and developed in collaboration with the International Hot Rod Association (IHRA).

Games 
 IHRA Motorsports (2000, PC)
 IHRA Drag Racing (2001, PS1, PC)
 IHRA Drag Racing 2 (2002, PS2)
 IHRA Drag Racing 2004 (2003, Xbox)
 IHRA Professional Drag Racing 2005 (2004, PC/PS2/Xbox)
 IHRA Drag Racing: Sportsman Edition (2006, PC/PS2/Xbox)

Development
The games were developed by Bethesda West, formerly known as Flashpoint Productions.

References

2000 video games
Bethesda Game Studios games
Bethesda Softworks games
Drag racing
PlayStation (console) games
PlayStation 2 games
Racing video games
Video game franchises
Video game franchises introduced in 2000
Video games developed in the United States
Windows games
Xbox games
ZeniMax Media franchises